The 1982–83 Virginia Cavaliers men's basketball team represented the University of Virginia and was a member of the Atlantic Coast Conference.

On December 23, 1982, the Chaminade Silverswords of Honolulu defeated the No. 1 ranked Cavaliers 77–72. Silverswords players Tony Randolph scored 19 points and Jim Dunham scored 17. Chaminade was ranked fourth in the NAIA rankings; center Ralph Sampson played the entire game and was held to twelve 

Virginia's two losses in conference were to co-champion North Carolina, and their two losses in the postseason were to eventual national champion North Carolina State; by three points in the final of the ACC tournament and by one point in the West region finals (Elite Eight) of the NCAA tournament.

Roster

Schedule 

|-
!colspan=9 style="background:#00214e; color:#f56d22;"| Exhibition game

|-
!colspan=9 style="background:#00214e; color:#f56d22;"| Regular season

|-
!colspan=9 style="background:#00214e; color:#f56d22;"| ACC Tournament

|-
!colspan=9 style="background:#00214e; color:#f56d22;"| NCAA Tournament

Rankings

Awards and honors
 Ralph Sampson, Adolph Rupp Trophy
 Ralph Sampson, Naismith College Player of the Year
 Ralph Sampson, USBWA College Player of the Year
 Ralph Sampson, John R. Wooden Award

NBA draft

References

Virginia Cavaliers men's basketball seasons
Virginia
Virginia
Virgin
Virgin